Iwaigawa Dam is a concrete gravity dam located in Nara prefecture in Japan. The dam is used for flood control. The catchment area of the dam is 3.3 km2. The dam impounds about 5  ha of land when full and can store 810 thousand cubic meters of water. The construction of the dam was started in 1974 and completed in 2008.

References

Dams in Nara Prefecture
2008 establishments in Japan